Colin Robinson (1962/1963 – March 4, 2021) was a social justice advocate from Trinidad and Tobago. Robinson's advocacy focused on LGBT+ issues, HIV policy, and health and gender justice.

Robinson grew up in Diego Martin, Trinidad. He graduated from St. Mary's College in 1979, being awarded an open national scholarship in modern languages.

Robinson founded the Coalition Advocating for Sexual Inclusion (CAISO) in 2009. He also co-founded the Caribbean Forum for Liberation and Acceptance of Genders and Sexualities. He was among the first to openly campaign for LGBT+ rights in Trinidad and Tobago and the Caribbean. Robinson was also known for his poetry and his work is considered to be part of the canon of queer Caribbean poetry.

Robinson died of colon cancer on March 4, 2021, at age 58.

References 

1960s births
Year of birth uncertain
2021 deaths
Trinidad and Tobago LGBT rights activists
Trinidad and Tobago poets
People from Diego Martin